Papa Kwamena Andze Turkson (born 17 January 1976) is a retired male boxer from Sweden.

Turkson competed for his native country at the 1996 Summer Olympics in Atlanta, Georgia, where he was stopped in the second round of the men's heavyweight division (– 91 kg) by Cuba's defending champion and later gold medalist Félix Savón after a knock-out in the first round. He twice won a bronze medal during his amateur career at the European Championships.

References

1976 births
Living people
Heavyweight boxers
Olympic boxers of Sweden
Boxers at the 1996 Summer Olympics
People from Vetlanda Municipality
Swedish male boxers
Sportspeople from Jönköping County
20th-century Swedish people